Carol Rosin (born March 29, 1944) is the Founder of the Institute for Security and Cooperation in Outer Space, and also works as a speaker, author, educator, child psychologist, futurist, and military strategist. She was also the first female executive of an aerospace company, working as a corporate manager of Fairchild Industries. She is executive director of the Peace and Emergency Action Coalition for Earth,  P.E.A.C.E. Inc. and the I.D.E.A Foundation, as well as a world peace ambassador for the International Association of Educators for World Peace.

Biography
Born in Wilmington, Delaware in 1944, received Bachelor's of Science from the University of Delaware and an honorary doctorate from Archbishop Solomon Gbadebo of the Orthodox College in Nigeria, Rosin was the first woman to work as an Aerospace executive at Fairchild Industries and is a leader and the original political architect in the movement to stop Anti-satellite weapons and the Strategic Defense Initiative. In her time at Fairchild, Rosin served as the spokesperson for Dr. Wernher Von Braun, with whom she created the film and educational program "It's Your Turn" to expand the diversity of people working in science fields. The program won many awards, including the Aviation Writers Award and the Science Teachers Gold Medal. Rosin helped create medical and educational training programs with ATS-6 satellites in the United States, including the first two-way audio and visual national and international satellite educational programs in over 20 countries.

Published works and media
Start of the Sirius Disclosure Project in 2001 at the National press Club, as witness.
Movies That Shook the World (Documentary) Herself, 2005
UFO: The Greatest Story Ever Denied II - Moon Rising (Video Documentary) Herself, 2009
Sirius (Documentary) Herself, 2013
For the Children (Book, I.D.E.A Foundation for the Benefit of Humanity) Co-Author, 2014 
The Carol Rosin Show (American Freedom Radio) Host, 2016-
Unacknowledged (Documentary) Herself, 2017
20th Anniversary of the Disclosure Project as herself, 2021
The Cosmic Hoax: An Exposé (Documentary) as herself, 2021

References 

Living people
1944 births
People from Wilmington, Delaware
Military strategists
University of Delaware alumni
American aerospace businesspeople